Survivor: Tocantins – The Brazilian Highlands is the eighteenth season of the American CBS competitive reality television series Survivor. The season was filmed in the microregion of Jalapão in Tocantins, Brazil, and first aired Thursday, February 12, 2009. CBS began casting for Survivor: Tocantins once production for Survivor: Gabon was underway. Applications were due by July 15, 2008, with in-person interviews being conducted in various cities sometime in August 2008, and semi-finalists traveling to Los Angeles, California sometime in September 2008. Sixteen applicants were chosen to compete on the show and were initially divided into two tribes. The season was filmed from November 1, 2008 to December 9, 2008. Exile Island returned this season, but with new twists. Instead of one castaway sent to Exile Island, two were sent. While on Exile Island, each exiled castaway picked from one of two urns. One urn contained a clue to the Hidden Immunity Idol and an option to join the opposing tribe, while the other urn contained nothing.

James Thomas Jr. was named the winner in the final episode on May 17, 2009, defeating Stephen Fishbach in a unanimous vote. In addition, J.T. was named "Sprint Player of the Season", earning the fans' vote over Tamara "Taj" Johnson-George and Sierra Reed. Thomas was the second player to win the game by a unanimous vote, following Earl Cole of Survivor: Fiji, but the first to receive no votes throughout the season in addition to a unanimous jury vote. This would be the last season to feature a final two until the twenty-eighth season, Survivor: Cagayan.

Contestants

The cast is composed of 16 new players, initially splitting into two tribes. The tribes are Jalapao and Timbira. The merged tribe Forza means "Force" in Italian. Notable cast includes SWV band member Tamara Johnson-George, and Miss USA 2003 contestant and Miss Ohio USA 2003 Candace Smith.

Future appearances
James "J.T." Thomas Jr., Benjamin "Coach" Wade, and Tyson Apostol later returned for Survivor: Heroes vs. Villains. Wade returned for his third time on Survivor: South Pacific. Apostol returned for his third time on Survivor: Blood vs. Water with his girlfriend Rachel Foulger. Stephen Fishbach returned for Survivor: Cambodia. Thomas returned for his third time on Survivor: Game Changers. Apostol returned to compete on Survivor: Winners at War.

Outside of Survivor, Apostol competed on The Challenge: USA.

Season summary
The players were split into two tribes, Timbira and Jalapao, prior to the game. However, before the game started, Jeff stated that each tribe was to vote for one of their own to not make the trek to camp. The selected members, Sierra from Timbira and Sandy from Jalapao, assumed they had been eliminated, but it was then revealed that these two would be flown to their respective campsites while the rest had to trek for four hours while carrying supplies. Ultimately, Sandy was eliminated pre-merge, but not before her tribemate Carolina was ousted first. Sierra made the jury.

Both the hidden immunity idol and Exile were in play, with the clues to the hidden idols available at Exile. The winning tribe of each reward challenge would be able to select one member of the losing tribe to be exiled, while the exiled player would be able to choose a member of the winning tribe to join them. Brendan from Timbira and Taj from Jalapao formed a secret cross-tribe alliance for the merge, bringing in Sierra and Stephen, respectively. The alliance members saw several repeat visits to Exile, securing both immunity idols by sharing the clues. After J.T. accidentally stumbled upon the hidden immunity idol in Stephen's pocket, Taj and Stephen agreed to bring J.T. into their own alliance, and the three decided to share the use of the hidden immunity idol. Timbira was able to win the last three tribal Immunity Challenges, leaving Taj, J.T., Stephen, and Joe as the only Jalapao members remaining. Shortly after the merge, Joe was evacuated from the game due to an infection in his knee.

After Joe's evacuation, Timbira had a major numerical advantage on Jalapao, up six players to three. However, Timbira had divided into several factions: Coach, Tyson, and Debbie, Brendan, and Sierra, and Erinn on the outside. Coach’s faction decided to align with J.T. and Stephen in an attempt to overthrow Brendan and Sierra. With Brendan and Sierra acting distant, Taj and Stephen decided to betray their Exile alliance; Brendan did not play his idol and was voted out. With the dissent among Timbira exposed, J.T., Stephen, and Taj aligned with Erinn, navigating between the two Timbira factions to eliminate them all, becoming the Final Four.

After knocking Taj out of the game due to her likelihood of winning the jury's vote, J.T. eliminated Erinn after he won his third consecutive immunity challenge, bringing Stephen to the Final Tribal Council. Stephen's poor Final Tribal Council performance combined with J.T.'s likability led the jury unanimously to vote for J.T. to be named Sole Survivor, believing J.T. played a stronger game compared to Stephen.

In the case of multiple tribes or castaways who win reward or immunity, they are listed in order of finish, or alphabetically where it was a team effort; where one castaway won and invited others, the invitees are in brackets.

Episodes

Voting history

Reception
Survivor: Tocantins – The Brazilian Highlands received very positive reviews from critics and fans alike. Fans and critics praised the "back-to-basics" structure of the season as well as the highly entertaining cast. Particular praise was handed to the personalities of finalists J.T Thomas and Stephen Fishbach, who formed a tight alliance early in the game and managed to make it to the end while remaining on great terms with the rest of the contestants. Contestants Benjamin "Coach" Wade and Tyson Apostol were met with polarized receptions due to their villainous behavior. Thomas, Fishbach, Wade, and Apostol would go on to compete in future seasons of the show and are seen as some of the most popular and influential players in Survivor history.  In 2015, a poll by Rob Has a Podcast ranked this season 11th out of 30 with Rob Cesternino ranking this season 12th. This was updated in 2021 during Cesternino's podcast, Survivor All-Time Top 40 Rankings, ranking 10th out of 40. Dalton Ross of Entertainment Weekly ranked this season 22nd out of 40 saying the season was bolstered by "Coach" and that "other than Tyson getting blindsided, were there any memorable moments that didn't involve the Dragonslayer?" The "Purple Rock Podcast" named the season the eleventh greatest in Survivor history, claiming, "The strategy is slightly lacking and there aren’t many gimmicks or twists, but the season makes up for it with comedy and a group of players so likable you probably won’t care much who wins the season." Similarly, Inside Survivor also ranked the season as the eleventh best. In their review, they highlighted that, "It has some modern-day twists (with idols and Exile), a couple of epic blindsides, and a shift into 'big-character' edits."

References

External links
 Official CBS Survivor: Tocantins Website

Tocantins
18
2009 American television seasons
2008 in Brazil
Television shows set in Brazil
Television shows filmed in Tocantins